Patrick Twumasi (born 9 May 1994) is a Ghanaian professional footballer who plays as a right winger for Israeli club Maccabi Netanya. He made two appearances for the Ghana national team in 2017.

Club career

Spartaks Jūrmala
Born in Obuasi, Patrick Twumasi joined the Latvian Higher League club Spartaks Jūrmala from Red Bull Ghana prior to the 2012 Latvian Higher League season. Soon he established himself as a first eleven player, scoring 10 goals in 22 league appearances and becoming the team's top scorer and divided seventh top scorer of the championship. In the beginning of the 2013 season, Twumasi scored six goals in the first nine matches and was named Latvian Higher League player of the month in May 2013.

Loans
In July 2013, Twumasi joined the Kazakhstan Premier League club FC Astana on loan from Spartaks Jūrmala. He scored six goals in 11 matches during the loan spell and later returned to Spartaks Jūrmala.

Prior to the 2014 season, Twumasi was loaned out to Russian Premier League club Amkar Perm. He made his debut in the Russian Premier League on 10 March 2014 in a game against Volga Nizhny Novgorod.

On 9 July 2014, Twumasi rejoined FC Astana on loan for the rest of the 2014 season. Scoring 10 goals in 11 matches he became the club's top scorer and helped Astana win the league.

Astana
Twumasi signed permanently for FC Astana prior to the 2015 season, despite attracting attention from other European clubs.

On 27 July 2017, Twumasi signed a new two-year contract with Astana.

Alavés
On 27 July 2018, Twumasi signed a four-year deal with La Liga side Deportivo Alavés.

Gaziantep
On 16 August 2019, Twumasi signed a one-year loan deal with Turkish Süper Lig club Gaziantep.

Hannover 96
On 4 September 2020, Twumasi signed a three-year contract with 2. Bundesliga club Hannover 96.

Maccabi Netanya
On 3 February 2022, Twumasi signed with Israeli Premier League club Maccabi Netanya.

International career
Twumasi was called up to the senior Ghana squad by Avram Grant for a 2017 Africa Cup of Nations qualifier against Mauritius in June 2016.

Career statistics

Club

International

Honours
Astana
 Kazakhstan Premier League: 2014, 2015, 2016, 2017
 Kazakhstan Super Cup: 2015

References

External links
 
 
 

1994 births
Living people
Ghanaian footballers
Association football wingers
FK Spartaks Jūrmala players
FC Astana players
FC Amkar Perm players
Red Bull Ghana players
Deportivo Alavés players
Hannover 96 players
Maccabi Netanya F.C. players
Russian Premier League players
Kazakhstan Premier League players
La Liga players
Süper Lig players
2. Bundesliga players
Israeli Premier League players
Ghanaian expatriate footballers
Expatriate footballers in Latvia
Expatriate footballers in Kazakhstan
Expatriate footballers in Russia
Expatriate footballers in Spain
Expatriate footballers in Germany
Expatriate footballers in Israel
Ghanaian expatriate sportspeople in Latvia
Ghanaian expatriate sportspeople in Kazakhstan
Ghanaian expatriate sportspeople in Russia
Ghanaian expatriate sportspeople in Spain
Ghanaian expatriate sportspeople in Germany
Ghanaian expatriate sportspeople in Israel
Ghana international footballers
People from Obuasi